Wlademiro Romero, deceased 1999, was an Angolan basketball coach. Together with Victorino Cunha, he is considered to be a large contributor in Angola's dominance over the African basketball arena. Romero led the Angola National team to an African title, in 1995 but failed to repeat the feat in 1997, finishing third. He also coached the national team at the 1996 Summer Olympics.

Following a car crash in late 1999, Romero was evacuated to South Africa for treatment. However, he died in that same year as a result of complications from the accident.

For all his deeds towards Angolan basketball, the Angolan Basketball Super Cup was renamed in 2001 as Wlademiro Romero Super Cup.

See also 
 List of FIBA AfroBasket winning head coaches
 Victorino Cunha
 Wlademiro Romero Super Cup

References

Angolan basketball coaches
1999 deaths
Year of birth missing
Atlético Petróleos de Luanda (basketball) coaches